Willie Norwood (born November 7, 1950) is a former Major League Baseball outfielder.

In 294 games over four seasons, Norwood posted a .242 batting average (207-for-854) with 109 runs, 18 home runs, 93 RBI and 41 stolen bases. He finished his career with a .959 fielding percentage playing at all three outfield positions.

External links
, or Retrosheet

1950 births
Living people
African-American baseball players
American expatriate baseball players in Mexico
Baseball players from Alabama
Broncos de Reynosa players
California State University, Long Beach alumni
La Verne Leopards baseball players
Long Beach State Dirtbags baseball players
Lynchburg Twins players
Major League Baseball outfielders
Minnesota Twins players
Orlando Twins players
People from Greene County, Alabama
Tacoma Twins players
Tigres de Aragua players
American expatriate baseball players in Venezuela
Toledo Mud Hens players
21st-century African-American people
20th-century African-American sportspeople
Long Beach Polytechnic High School alumni